In medicine, an agonal heart rhythm is a variant of asystole. Agonal heart rhythm is usually ventricular in origin.  Occasional P waves and QRS complexes can be seen on the electrocardiogram. The complexes tend to be wide and bizarre in morphological appearance. Clinically, an agonal rhythm is regarded as asystole and should be treated equivalently, with cardiopulmonary resuscitation and administration of intravenous adrenaline. As in asystole, the prognosis for a patient presenting with this rhythm is very poor. Sometimes this appears after asystole or after a failed resuscitation attempt.

See also
 Asystole
 Cardiac arrest
 Myocardial infarction
 Ventricular fibrillation

References

Medical emergencies
Causes of death
Cardiac arrhythmia